Jack & Jill is an American comedy-drama television series created and produced by Randi Mayem Singer. It ran from September 26, 1999, to April 15, 2001, on The WB. The series stars Ivan Sergei, Amanda Peet, Sarah Paulson, Jaime Pressly, Justin Kirk, and Simon Rex.

Premise
Jacqueline Barrett ("Jack") abandons her unfaithful fiancee at the altar, and heads to NYC (where her friend Audrey works as a dancer) to rebuild her life. Moving in to Audrey's apartment, she encounters  David Jillefsky ("Jill") who's preparing to move in with his girlfriend Elisa. "Jack" and "Jill" develop a hot and cold romantic relationship, but face obstacles in their relationships with their friends.

Cast

 Ivan Sergei as David "Jill" Jillefsky
 Amanda Peet as Jacqueline "Jack" Barrett
 Sarah Paulson as Elisa Cronkite
 Jaime Pressly as Audrey Griffin
 Justin Kirk as Barto Zane
 Simon Rex as Mikey Russo

Production
The main characters were David Jillefsky (Ivan Sergei) and Jacqueline Barrett (Amanda Peet, replacing Amelia Heinle after the pilot). The two become romantically involved just as they both face major obstacles in their relationships with their friends. The show's theme song was "Truth About Romeo" written by Pancho's Lament, the stage name of songwriter Jeff Cohen. It was performed by Pancho's Lament during the first season and by David Crosby and Beth Hart in the second season.

Due to the average ratings of the first season, the second season was only 13 episodes long and was aired as a midseason show. The final episode detailed the problems during preparations for the couple's wedding. Jacqueline discovered she was pregnant, but before she could tell David, he decided that their relationship was moving too fast and he wanted to call the wedding off and move things slower. Despite the rallying of fans, the series was not renewed for a third season, so the series ended in a cliffhanger.

Co-stars Amanda Peet and Sarah Paulson would later reunite for the NBC series Studio 60 on the Sunset Strip, which debuted in 2006.

Episodes

Series overview

Season 1 (1999–2000)

Season 2 (2001)

Reception
The series was nominated for an Artios Award in 2000 by the Casting Society of America for Dramatic Pilot Casting.

References

External links
 

1990s American comedy-drama television series
1999 American television series debuts
2000s American comedy-drama television series
2001 American television series endings
English-language television shows
Fictional couples
Television series by Warner Bros. Television Studios
Television shows set in New York City
The WB original programming